Ingvar Hansson (born 19 February 1947) is a Swedish sailor and Olympic champion. He competed at the 1976 Summer Olympics in Montreal, where he received a gold medal in the Tempest class, together with John Albrechtson.

References

1947 births
Living people
Swedish male sailors (sport)
Olympic sailors of Sweden
Sailors at the 1972 Summer Olympics – Tempest
Sailors at the 1976 Summer Olympics – Tempest
Olympic gold medalists for Sweden
Olympic medalists in sailing
Star class sailors
Medalists at the 1976 Summer Olympics
20th-century Swedish people